Kevin Osei (born 26 March 1991) is a French professional footballer who plays as a midfielder for French National 2 club Aubagne FC

Club career

Early career
Kevin joined Marseille when he was 12 from Olympique Saint Maximinois. He went through their youth system, winning many youth trophies, including "Championnat National des 16 ans" (Under 16 National Championship), after reaching with his team in 2008 the Under 16 final stage for the first time in Marseille's history.
He went on to join Marseille's first team in 2009, after signing an "Elite" contract (2 years as a trainee and 3 years as a professional).
His first professional match with Marseille was against AEL Limassol in the UEFA Europa League

Beveren
Osei signed a six-month contract with Belgian Jupiler Pro League club Beveren in January 2015.

Carlisle United
Osei penned a six-month deal with the option to extend on 28 July 2015 with English League Two club Carlisle United following a successful trial spell. On 23 December Osei was released by the club by mutual consent.

Spartak Pleven
On 18 October 2016, Osei joined Bulgarian Second League club Spartak Pleven. He was released at the end of the season.

Lokomotiv GO
On 15 September 2017, Osei joined another Second League club, Lokomotiv Gorna Oryahovitsa.  He left the club at the end of the 2017–18 season.

Perlis FA
In January 2019 it was announced that Osei had signed a one-year contract with Perlis F.A. in the Malaysia Premier League, however in February 2019 Perlis were disqualified from the tournament.

Aubagne
In October 2019, Osei signed for French Championnat National 3 side Aubagne FC.

UKM
In February 2020, Osei returned to Malaysia, signing for UKM F.C.

International career
Osei has expressed his desire to play for Ghana.
He was meant to take part in the 2011 African Youth Championship, but because of delays in obtaining his Ghanaian passport, he wasn't eligible to play for the Ghana U20 national team. He continues to follow Ghanaian national teams in every competition they are engaged in.

References

External links
  Osei et ndoumbou bientot pros. lequipe.fr 
Entretien avec Kevin Osei je suis a 100 marseillais. lequipe.fr 
Om deux renforts pour le futur bientot signes. footmercato.net 
Les yeux dans Osei. footmercato.net 

1991 births
Living people
Footballers from Marseille
French footballers
Ghanaian footballers
French sportspeople of Ghanaian descent
Association football midfielders
Olympique de Marseille players
Aviron Bayonnais FC players
S.K. Beveren players
Carlisle United F.C. players
PFC Spartak Pleven players
FC Lokomotiv Gorna Oryahovitsa players
Perlis FA players
Ligue 1 players
Belgian Pro League players
English Football League players
Championnat National 3 players
Second Professional Football League (Bulgaria) players
French expatriate footballers
French expatriate sportspeople in Belgium
French expatriate sportspeople in England
French expatriate sportspeople in Bulgaria
French expatriate sportspeople in Malaysia
Expatriate footballers in Belgium
Expatriate footballers in England
Expatriate footballers in Bulgaria
Expatriate footballers in Malaysia
UKM F.C. players
Aubagne FC players